The Dollhouse was a professional wrestling stable in Total Nonstop Action Wrestling (TNA), active in the promotion between 2015 and 2016.

Dollhouse underwent several member changes throughout its tenure in TNA. The faction initially debuted as a tag team of Jade and Marti Bell in 2015, and were soon joined by then-Women's Knockout Champion Taryn Terrell, who led the group for the remainder of the year. The group saw further expansion when Rebel joined the group in the summer of 2015. Terrell left TNA in 2016 and Awesome Kong joined Dollhouse as the new leader but her tenure was brief as she was fired by TNA a month later. Shortly after, the stable disbanded in TNA as all three members went their separate ways.

However, Rebel and Belle competed as Dollhouse after leaving TNA on the independent circuit before the faction permanently disbanded in 2017.

History

Total Nonstop Action Wrestling

Taryn Terrell's leadership (2015–2016)
On the April 10, 2015 episode of Impact Wrestling, a vignette aired hyping the TNA debut of The Dollhouse (Jade and Marti Bell). Two weeks later, Dollhouse debuted in TNA at TKO: A Night of Knockouts special episode of Impact Wrestling, where Jade competed against Laura Dennis. Jade was disqualified after Bell attacked Dennis. Dollhouse attacked Dennis and ring announcer Christy Hemme after the match and shoved a jawbreaker into Hemme's mouth. Later that night, Dollhouse interfered in Taryn Terrell's Women's Knockout Championship defense against Awesome Kong in a no disqualification match by hitting Kong with kendo sticks and assisting Terrell in powerbombing Kong through a table, allowing Terrell to retain the title. Terrell stuffed a jawbreaker into Kong's mouth after the match and joined the Dollhouse as its leader.

At Hardcore Justice, Terrell retained the Women's Knockout Championship against Brooke with assistance from Jade and Bell. Terrell stuffed a jawbreaker into Brooke's mouth after the match until Awesome Kong and Gail Kim confronted Dollhouse. As a result, Dollhouse began feuding with various Knockouts including Brooke, Kong, Kim and Rebel. On the May 8 episode of Impact Wrestling, Dollhouse defeated Kong and Kim in a handicap match. Terrell's feud with Kim intensified when she invaded an event that Kim's step-daughters attended and stalked them. Terrell would further taunt Kim by saying that she would seduce Kim's husband. This led to Terrell defending the title against Kim in a Six Sides of Steel match at May Mayhem, where Jade and Bell helped Terrell in retaining the title. After the match, Terrell locked the cage door and humiliated Kim by ripping off her wedding ring and stomping her hand.

At Destination X, Terrell challenged Kong to a Lingerie Pillow Fight for the championship, but Kong refused to wear a lingerie and instead attacked Jade and Bell. Terrell demanded to be declared the winner but Brooke made the save and removed Terrell's robe to reveal her lingerie underneath. On the June 17 episode of Impact Wrestling, Dollhouse conducted a Dollhouse Pillow Talk segment, during which Terrell announced that if Brooke and Kong were able to defeat Jade and Bell in a Double or Nothing match, they would both earn a title shot against Terrell. Brooke and Kong won the match. Dollhouse would then compete against Brooke and Kong in a handicap match at Slammiversary, which they lost. On the July 1 episode of Impact Wrestling, Terrell retained the Women's Knockout Championship against Brooke and Kong in a three-way match, with assistance by Jade and Bell.

On the July 15 episode of Impact Wrestling, Terrell lost the Women's Knockout Championship to Brooke after a distraction by Gail Kim, who attacked Jade and Bell, preventing them from interfering in the match. The following week, on Impact Wrestling, Dollhouse interrupted Christy Hemme and locked themselves in a cage where Terrell berated Brooke's win and insulted Kim, prompting Brooke to distract them and allowing Kim to attack Dollhouse. On the July 29 episode of Impact Wrestling, Bell received a title shot against Brooke for the Women's Knockout Championship, losing the match after interference by Kim. This led to Dollhouse facing Kim in a handicap match at No Surrender, which Dollhouse lost. At Turning Point, Jade and Bell lost to Kim in a handicap Six Sides of Steel match. After the match, Velvet Sky interrupted Terrell from fleeing the arena backstage and assisted Kim in attacking Terrell and breaking her hand, as a retribution for Terrell injuring Kim's hand months ago. This was Terrell's last appearance in TNA due to injury. However, she continued to appear on TNA programming via screen and directed orders to Dollhouse members. 

On the August 26 episode of Impact Wrestling, Dollhouse avenged Sky's attack on Terrell by interfering in Sky's Women's Knockout Championship match against Brooke. Dollhouse attacked Sky until Rebel apparently made the save, only to turn on Sky by attacking her and joining Dollhouse as the newest member. This led to Dollhouse beginning a feud with The Beautiful People (Angelina Love, Madison Rayne and Velvet Sky) after Love and Rayne came to rescue Sky from an attack by Dollhouse on the September 2 episode of Impact Wrestling. The two teams brawled with each other throughout the following few weeks, culminating in a handicap match between the two teams on the September 30 episode of Impact Wrestling, in which Dollhouse defeated Rayne and Sky. Dollhouse did not appear in TNA during the TNA World Title Series for the next three months.

On January 4, 2016, Terrell left TNA.

Awesome Kong's inclusion and dissolution (2016)
Dollhouse returned to TNA on the January 5 episode of Impact Wrestling and resumed their rivalry with Beautiful People, losing to Madison Rayne, Velvet Sky and Gail Kim. However, Dollhouse attacked Kim and Beautiful People after the match until Awesome Kong made the save, only to attack Kim and Beautiful People and joining Dollhouse. The following week, on Impact Wrestling, Jade and Kong defeated Beautiful People in a street fight. On the January 19 episode of Impact Wrestling, Kong failed to win the Women's Knockout Championship after Beautiful People prevented Dollhouse from interfering on Kong's behalf by attacking them. On the January 26 episode of Impact Wrestling, Kong defeated Sky and continued to attack her after the match until Rayne made the save only to get outnumbered by Dollhouse. This would be Kong's last appearance in TNA as she was fired by the promotion in February due to a backstage altercation with Matt Hardy's wife Reby Sky during a tour of the United Kingdom.

On the February 9 episode of Impact Wrestling, Dollhouse appeared excluding Kong, with no mention of her on television, and Jade defeated Madison Rayne in a match. On the February 16 episode of Impact Wrestling, Rebel and Bell lost to Kim and Rayne in a match, but Dollhouse attacked them after the match, causing Sky to make the save. Sky then challenged Dollhouse to take on Kim, Rayne and herself in a Lethal Lockdown match at Lockdown. However, Rayne got injured before the match, making it a handicap match between Dollhouse and the team of Kim and Sky. Maria Kanellis initially joined the match as Rayne's replacement but abandoned Kim and Sky, allowing Jade to pin Kim for the win.

On the March 1 episode of Impact Wrestling, Jade attacked Kim and challenged her to a match for the Women's Knockout Championship for the following week's Impact Wrestling, where she lost to Kim. On the March 22 episode of Impact Wrestling, the three Dollhouse members competed in a three-way match to earn a title shot at the Women's Knockout Championship. Jade defeated her teammates, thus quietly dissolving Dollhouse. All the three members of Dollhouse went their separate ways, with Jade enjoying major success and eventually winning the Women's Knockout Championship and Rebel and Bell competing in the Knockouts division for a few months before leaving TNA.

Independent circuit (2015–2017)
Jade and Bell made a few appearances as The Dollhouse on the independent circuit, primarily Women Superstars Uncensored (WSU), debuting for the promotion at Control on July 11, 2015, where they unsuccessfully challenged Chicks Using Nasty Tactics (Annie Social and Kimber Lee) for the WSU Tag Team Championship. Dollhouse made their next appearance in WSU at the Excellence pay-per-view, where they received another title shot against Chicks Using Nasty Tactics for the Tag Team Championship, but lost again. At WSU's co-promotional event with Combat Zone Wrestling (CZW) titled Cherry T, where they unsuccessfully challenged Team Tremendous (Bill Carr and Dan Barry) for the CZW World Tag Team Championship. They also made an appearance for Extreme Wrestling Organization (EWO) at Twas The Night After Christmas, where they defeated Angel Dust and Dazy Day.

Dollhouse's next appearance in the independent circuit occurred at Fighting Evolution Wrestling (FEW) event Flares'' on March 31, 2017, where Bell and Rebel reunited after a year, and defeated Rainbow Bright (Gabby Gilbert and Luscious Latasha). This was Dollhouse's last match as a team.
Championships and accomplishmentsTotal Nonstop Action Wrestling'''
TNA Women's Knockout Championship (1 time) – Taryn Terrell

References

External links
Dollhouse's profile at Cagematch, Wrestlingdata.com

Impact Wrestling teams and stables
Women's wrestling teams and stables